Jay Martin may refer to:
Jay Martin (ski jumper) (born 1944), American former ski jumper
Jay Martin (coach), head college soccer coach
Jay Martin, TV director and singer, husband of Denise Lor
Jay Martin, American football player in the 1991 Florida Citrus Bowl
Jay Martin (lawyer), former state representative United States House of Representatives elections in Arkansas, 2012